Maytenus robusta, known in Brazil as cafezinho do mato or coração de bugre, is a species of plant in the family Celastraceae. It is endemic to Brazil. 

Maytenus robusta is used in folk medicine to treat gastric ulcers.

References

Medicinal plants
Traditional Brazilian medicine
robusta
Endemic flora of Brazil